The Orlogsværftet O-Maskinen was a military training/multi-purpose biplane developed by the Orlogsværftet Flying Machine Workshop in 1926. Two versions were created: the two seat IO (14 produced) and single seat IIO (1 produced).

Specifications
Specifications are for IO unless otherwise noted.

Construction:	Welded steel tubing and canvas 
Seats: 2 (1 for IIO)
Wing span: 10.66 m
Length	8.4 m
Height	2.7 m
Weight empty: 1000 kg
Weight full: 1400 kg
Max speed:	200 km/h
Cruise Speed 150 km/h
Range: 500 km
Max altitude: 	6000 m
Armament (optional): One or two 8 mm Madsen machine guns

One aircraft, registration O-70, crashed on July 23, 1931 while flying in formation with five other IOs in a training flight. Both occupants were killed.

References

 Military equipment of the interwar period